André Rötheli (born October 12, 1970) is a Swiss former professional ice hockey centre.

Records
 1998 with EV Zug
 2003 with HC Lugano
 2004 with SC Bern

International play
He was the top scorer in the B Pool of the 1990 World Junior Ice Hockey Championships in Bad Tölz, West Germany.

Rötheli played 74 games for the Swiss national team.

He participated in 2 Olympic Games: 1992 in Albertville and 2002 in Salt Lake City.

Career statistics

Regular season and playoffs

International

External links

Rötheli on hockeyfans.ch

1970 births
Living people
EHC Olten players
EV Zug players
HC Lugano players
Ice hockey players at the 1992 Winter Olympics
Ice hockey players at the 2002 Winter Olympics
Olympic ice hockey players of Switzerland
SC Bern players
Swiss ice hockey centres